Frunzenskaya Embankment is a street and embankment in Khamovniki District of Moscow. It is a section of the embankment along the Moskva between the Krymsky and Novoandreevsky Bridges.

Etymology
Along with three adjacent streets, Frunzenskaya Embankment was named after the Russian Bolshevik military commander Mikhail Frunze. The embankment's historic and original name is Khamovnicheskaya Embankment. The date of renaming under the Soviet regime in different sources is 1925, 1926, and 1936. The last date is most likely correct, since on the map of Moscow in 1934, the embankment was still called Khamovnicheskaya.

References

Streets in Moscow